Matthews Johannes Wolmarans (born 1968 or 1969) is a South African politician who has been a Member of the National Assembly of South Africa since 2019. A member of the African National Congress, he previously served in the assembly between 2017 and 2019. Wolmarans is also a former mayor of the Rustenburg Local Municipality.

Career
Wolmarans is a member of the African National Congress. He served as the mayor of the Rustenburg Local Municipality. He served on the provincial executive committee on the ANC in the North West.

Murder conviction and subsequent acquittal
In July 2012, Wolmarans, the then-speaker of the municipality, and his former bodyguard, Enoch Matshaba, were found guilty of the murder of Moss Phakoe, a corruption and fraud whistle-blower and ANC councillor in the Rustenburg Local Municipality. Phakoe was shot dead in his driveway outside his home in Rustenburg on 14 March 2009, two days after he had handed over a dossier detailing fraud and corruption allegations in the municipality to former co-operative governance and traditional affairs minister Sicelo Shiceka. He also allegedly gave the dossier to senior ANC officials. Wolmarans was sentenced to twenty years in prison, while Matshaba was sentenced to life in prison.

He was jailed at the Rooigrond Prison in Mahikeng, the provincial capital of the North West province. In September 2012, the Mail & Guardian newspaper revealed that Wolmarans was still receiving a salary from the Rustenburg municipality, despite being imprisoned. The national executive committee of the ANC had instructed that his party membership be terminated to remove him as a councillor, however, the provincial executive committee did not act on the instruction.

In June 2014, the Supreme Court of Appeal set aside the conviction of him and Matshaba, because a witness changed his evidence. Wolmarans soon after announced that he would be suing the state and seven police officers for wrongfully arresting him and charging him with Phakoe's murder.

Parliamentary career
In August 2017, the North West ANC structure announced that it would be sending Wolmarans to the National Assembly of South Africa to fill the vacancy that was created by the resignation of former Eskom CEO, Brian Molefe. The decision was criticised by other ANC members. Wolmarans was sworn into office on 21 September 2017 by deputy speaker Lechesa Tsenoli. For the remainder of the term, Wolmarans sat on the  Portfolio Committee on Human Settlements and the  Portfolio Committee on Higher Education and Training. He was not placed high enough on the ANC's national candidate list for the general election on May 8, 2019 and as a consequence of this, he did not return to parliament immediately after the election.

Former Labour minister and ANC MP Mildred Oliphant resigned her seat in the National Assembly in June 2019 after she was not reappointed to the cabinet. The ANC chose Wolmarans to fill her seat and he was sworn in as a Member of the National Assembly on 19 June. On 27 June 2019, he was appointed to sit on the Portfolio Committee on Mineral Resources and Energy and the  Portfolio Committee on Employment and Labour.

Personal life
Wolmarans' wife was diagnosed with cancer during his murder trial. He has two children.

References

External links
Profile at Parliament of South Africa
Profile at African National Congress Parliamentary Caucus

Living people
Year of birth missing (living people)
Place of birth missing (living people)
Tswana people
Members of the National Assembly of South Africa
African National Congress politicians
Mayors of places in South Africa